Tiphobia horei is a species of freshwater snail with an operculum, an aquatic gastropod mollusk in the family Paludomidae.

Tiphobia horei is the only species in the genus Tiphobia. Tiphobia is the type genus of the tribe Tiphobiini.

The specific name horei is in honor of Reverend Edward Coode Hore (1848-1912) from the UK.

Distribution and habitat 
Tiphobia horei is endemic to Lake Tanganyika. It is found in Burundi, the Democratic Republic of the Congo, Tanzania, and Zambia. The type locality is Lake Tanganyika at Ujiji.

It is typically found on muddy bottoms and often near river mouths. It ranges from the shoreline to a depth of about  but tends to be more common in deeper waters.

Description
Tiphobia horei has a large shell with spines, so it is easily to determine.

This snail feeds on detritus.

Conservation status 
This snail was given Endangered species status in 1996, but in 2006 this was revised to Least Concern, as it was found to be widespread within the lake and at least locally common. It is facing sedimentation, dredging and shell collecting, but these are considered to be minor threats to this species.

References

External links 

 Moore J. E. (1898). "The mollusks of the Great African lakes. 2. The anatomy of the Typhobias, with a description of a new genus (Batanalia) (sic)". Quarterly Journal of Microscopical Science 41: 181-204. Plate 11-14.

Paludomidae
Gastropods described in 1880
Taxa named by Edgar Albert Smith
Taxonomy articles created by Polbot
Snails of Lake Tanganyika